Kontsert (Russian: Концерт, ; commonly read as Kohuept or Kohliept) is the second live album by Billy Joel, released in 1987. The album was recorded during the Soviet leg of Joel's 1987 The Bridge tour. This album was co-produced by Jim Boyer and Brian Ruggles, and mixed by Jim Boyer.

Background 
In 1986 Billy Joel was invited to perform in the Soviet Union the following year, 1987. Joel took advantage of this opportunity to be a musical ambassador. He was seen as a "nice, safe, first attempt at bringing in an American 'pop star.'"

The concert 
The tour of the Soviet Union consisted of six shows, three in Moscow and three in Leningrad. Joel brought his family with him to show the Russians that he felt safe and trusted the Russian people. During the show Joel gave new meanings to songs such as "Honesty". Each time the song was performed, he dedicated the song to Vladimir Vysotsky because he was an inspirational Russian man who "spoke the truth."

During the second of the three concerts performed in Moscow at the Olympic Sports Complex, Joel flipped his electric keyboard, and broke his microphone stand on his grand piano. While performing "Sometimes a Fantasy", the audience kept getting attention from spotlights, which angered Joel as he felt it was making it harder to connect with them: The Soviet crowd, raised by decades of Iron Curtain austerity, stopped dancing and froze like deer in headlights when they were lit up, petrified that the security guards would crack down on them. Then the lights would go out again and they'd resume dancing. Lights off, dancing. Lights on, frozen stiff. This went on and on like a game of red light, green light, one-two-three. With each flick of the lights, the perfectionist Joel saw his hard earned connection fading away. 

He yelled, "Stop lighting the audience!" He then trashed his instruments, overturning his piano and breaking his mic stand. He later claimed that, "People like their privacy. They go to a concert to get that, to be in the dark and do their own thing."

Joel brought his daughter Alexa Ray Joel and his wife Christie Brinkley on tour with the band. He also crowd-surfed during his performances. While in Leningrad, Billy dove into the crowd during the performance of "The Longest Time". This was another way for him to show that he trusted the Russian people.

Joel had played a tour in Europe prior to the tour in the Soviet Union, and was being interviewed during the day. As a result, his voice became hoarse. Joel himself stated that he was disappointed by the album, and believes his vocals were not up to par during its production. Despite his opinion, Columbia Records released the album, claiming it was a "historic event". Joel and his band jokingly refer to the album as Kaput.

Impact 
Prior to this show, rock music was barely gaining ground in the Soviet Union. The implementation of Gorbachev's glasnost allowed people of the Soviet Union to witness Western Rock. As a result, the government had to learn how to put on concerts, while the people of Russia had to learn how to participate in them. Joel's Russian tour was the first live rock radio broadcast in Soviet history. Joel and his band were one of the first western rock groups to perform in Russia, along with John Denver, Elton John, James Taylor, and Santana.

While in Russia, Billy Joel and his daughter Alexa met and became friends with a clown named Viktor. The song "Leningrad" would eventually be written about him. This song was released on the 1989 Storm Front album.

Joel went on to say: The trip to Russia was probably the biggest highlight for me as a performer. I met these people and they weren't the enemy. I also hoped that the people in America could see what we did. What happens when your kid says to you 'what did you do in the Cold War, Daddy?' And now we have something to say.

Kontsert track listing

A Matter of Trust: The Bridge to Russia 

On May 19, 2014, the album was re-released and retitled as A Matter of Trust: The Bridge to Russia, a two-CD, one-DVD/Blu-ray set incorporating eleven previously unreleased tracks on CD and seven previously unreleased and restored songs on video. In addition, the DVD/Blu-ray set contains a newly produced documentary of the same name which features updated interviews with Joel's current and former band members as well as personnel involved with the original 1987 production. "Superfans are likely to drool over the deluxe edition which includes a book with accounts from writers and journalists who were on the road with Joel during the tour," Charles Pitter at PopMatters wrote."

Track listing 
All songs written by Billy Joel, except where noted.

Disc one
"Odoya" (Traditional Georgian) – 1:16
"Prelude/Angry Young Man" – 5:33
"Honesty" – 5:15
"The Ballad of Billy the Kid" – 5:32
"She's Always a Woman" – 3:35
"Scenes from an Italian Restaurant" – 8:21
"Goodnight Saigon" – 6:37
"Stiletto" – 5:10
"Big Man on Mulberry Street" – 7:29
"Baby Grand" – 6:14
"What's Your Name" – 2:17
"The Longest Time" – 5:11
"An Innocent Man" – 6:04

Disc two
"Pressure" – 5:23
"Allentown" – 3:52
"A Matter of Trust" – 5:10
"Only the Good Die Young" – 3:32
"It's Still Rock and Roll to Me" – 4:00
"Sometimes a Fantasy" – 3:38
"You May Be Right" – 5:35
"Uptown Girl" – 3:09
"Big Shot" – 4:54
"Back in the U.S.S.R." (Lennon/McCartney) – 2:55
"The Times They Are A-Changin'" (Dylan) – 2:38
"She Loves You" (Lennon/McCartney) (Russian concerts rehearsal recording) – 2:24
"New York State of Mind" (Russian concerts rehearsal recording) – 6:22
"Piano Man" (Russian concerts rehearsal recording) – 4:25

DVD/Blu-ray
"Prelude/Angry Young Man"
"Allentown"
"Goodnight Saigon"
"Big Man on Mulberry Street"
"Baby Grand"
"An Innocent Man"
"Honesty"
"The Longest Time"
"A Matter of Trust"
"Only the Good Die Young"
"It's Still Rock and Roll to Me"
"Sometimes a Fantasy"
"You May Be Right"
"Uptown Girl"
"Big Shot"
"Back in the U.S.S.R."
Bonus song: 
"Pressure"

Personnel 
 Billy Joel – vocals, grand piano, harmonica, keyboards, electric guitar
 Dave Lebolt – keyboards 
 Mark Rivera – keyboards, alto saxophone, baritone saxophone, lyricon, tambourine, backing vocals 
 Russell Javors – acoustic guitars, electric guitars, harmonica, backing vocals
 Kevin Dukes – electric guitars, acoustic guitars
 Doug Stegmeyer – bass guitar, electric upright bass
 Liberty DeVitto – drums, maracas, Simmons drums
 Peter Hewlett – percussion, backing vocals
 George Simms – percussion, backing vocals
 The Georgian Rustavi Ensemble of USSR – vocals on "Odoya"
 Oleg Smirnoff – on-stage translation

Charts

Certifications

See also
Снова в СССР, Paul McCartney album originally released in 1988 exclusively in the Soviet Union

References

Billy Joel live albums
1987 live albums
Sony BMG live albums
Albums produced by Jim Boyer (audio engineer)